Star Ace is a role-playing game published by Pacesetter Ltd in 1984.

Description
Star Ace is a science-fiction system. The rules are simple; most actions are resolved by checking against a single multi-purpose table. Player characters are Star Aces, interstellar outlaws who oppose the Empire. The game includes a rulebook (64 pages), a campaign setting, the "Wilderness Briefing Manual" (32 pages), an introductory scenario "Deuces Wild" (16 pages), a star map, and counters. The game is compatible with Chill and Timemaster.

Publication history
Star Ace was designed by Mark Acres and Gali Sanchez, and was published by Pacesetter Ltd in 1984 as a boxed set including a 64-page book, a 32-page book, and a 16-page book, a large color map, a cardstock counter sheet, and dice.

Chill, Timemaster, and Star Ace were all built around the same house system and all released by Pacesetter within a year.

Reception
Marcus L. Rowland reviewed Star Ace for White Dwarf #67, giving it an overall rating of 5 out of 10, and stated that "All in al1, a dull and uninspiring game and I think that Pacesetter   should have tried to develop something completely new, rather than re-hashing  old themes and producing a disappointing result."

Warren Spector reviewed Star Ace in Space Gamer No. 75. Spector commented that "if I could buy just one Pacesetter game – and maybe even just one science fiction game – Star Ace would be the one. It's flawed, but utterly charming – a 'Golly-gosh gee-whiz, Captain Terrific!' sort of game. and what the heck, you'll hear the sound of lasers roaring through the vacuum of outer space as flaming engines propel you at speeds far greater than that of light. So it ain't science."

Lawrence Schick describes the game system as "heavy on the fiction (dramatic role-playing) and light on the science", and suggested that the game was inspired by the Star Wars movies.

References

External links

Pacesetter games
Role-playing games introduced in 1984
Science fiction role-playing games